A roadblock is a temporary installation set up to control or block traffic along a road. The reasons for one could be:
Roadworks
Temporary road closure during special events
Police chase
Robbery
Sobriety checkpoint

In peaceful circumstances, they are usually installed by the police or road transport authorities; they are also commonly employed during wars and are usually staffed by heavily armed soldiers in that case. During protests and riots, both police and demonstrators sometimes use roadblocks.

References

See also

 Road traffic control
 Barricade
 Boom barrier
 Braess's paradox
 Illinois v. Lidster
 Safety barrier
 Traffic break

Street furniture